Opus De Don is an album by organist Don Patterson recorded in 1968 and released on the Prestige label.

Reception

Allmusic awarded the album 3 stars.

Track listing 
All compositions by Don Patterson except as indicated
 "Little Shannon" (Billy James) - 6:53   
 "Opus De Don" - 6:35   
 "Dem New York Dues" - 7:22   
 "Sir John" (Blue Mitchell) - 9:18   
 "Stairway to the Stars" (Matty Malneck, Mitchell Parish, Frank Signorelli) - 9:42

Personnel 
Don Patterson - organ
Blue Mitchell - trumpet
Junior Cook - tenor saxophone
Pat Martino - guitar
Billy James - drums

References 

Don Patterson (organist) albums
1968 albums
Prestige Records albums
Albums produced by Don Schlitten